Andreini is an Italian surname. Notable people with the surname include:

Alfredo Andreini (1870–1943), Italian physician and entomologist and discoverer of 25 of the convex uniform honeycombs (also called Andreini tessellations) in 1900
Eddie Andreini (1937–2014), American aerobatic pilot
Francesco Andreini (c. 1548–1624), Italian actor
Francesco Andreini (painter) (1697–1751), Italian painter
Giambattista Andreini (1576–1654), Italian playwright and actor
Isabella Andreini (1562–1604), Italian actress
Marco Andreini (born 1961), retired Italian pole vaulter
Matteo Andreini (born 1981), Sammarinese footballer 
Reno Andreini (1875-1880–after 1924), Italian operatic tenor
Virginia Ramponi-Andreini, also known by her stage name "La Florinda" (1583–c.1630), celebrated Italian actress and singer

Italian-language surnames
Patronymic surnames
Surnames from given names